FC Mendrisio is a football club from Mendrisio, Switzerland. The club was founded in 1924.

Current squad
As of 21 March 2020

References

External links
 Official website

Football clubs in Switzerland
Association football clubs established in 1924
Mendrisio
1924 establishments in Switzerland
Sport in Ticino